Protein lyl-1 is a protein that in humans is encoded by the LYL1 gene.

Interactions 

LYL1 has been shown to interact with TCF3 and NFKB1.

References

Further reading

External links 
 

Transcription factors